The A-Team is a 2010 American action thriller film based on the 1980s television series of the same name created by Frank Lupo and Stephen J. Cannell. Directed by Joe Carnahan and written by Carnahan, Brian Bloom, and Skip Woods, the film stars Liam Neeson, Bradley Cooper, Jessica Biel, Quinton Jackson, Sharlto Copley, and Patrick Wilson. The film tells the story of a Special Forces team who, imprisoned for a crime they did not commit, escapes and sets out to clear their names. The film was produced by Cannell, Tony Scott, and (as executive producer) his brother Ridley Scott.

The film had been in development since the mid-1990s having gone through a number of writers and story ideas and being put on hold a number of times. Neeson, Cooper, and the rest of the cast joined in summer 2009, and filming took place around Canada later that year. The film was theatrically released on June 11, 2010, by 20th Century Fox. It received mixed reviews from critics, who praised the cast and action sequences but criticized the script. A sequel was initially anticipated, but after the film underperformed at the box office, grossing $177 million worldwide against its $110 million budget, plans were scrapped.

Plot
John "Hannibal" Smith is held captive in Mexico by two Federal Police officers working for renegade General Javier Tuco. Hannibal escapes and sets out to rescue his friend Templeton "Face" Peck, who is held captive at Tuco's ranch. Hannibal saves Face after enlisting former Ranger B.A. Baracus, driving to the rescue in B.A.'s modified GMC Vandura. Pursued by Tuco, they stop at a nearby Army hospital to recruit the services of their pilot Howling Mad Murdock. They flee in a medical helicopter, chased by Tuco, in a dogfight that leaves B.A. with a phobia of flying. The battle ends when they lure Tuco's helicopter into American airspace, where it is shot down by an F-22 Raptor for trespassing, killing Tuco and his men.

Eight years later in Iraq, Hannibal is contacted by CIA Special Activities Division operative Lynch, who assigns them on a black operation to recover U.S. Treasury plates and over $1 billion in cash slated to move out of Baghdad in an armored convoy. Hannibal's commanding officer, General Morrison, consents to the operation but Face's former girlfriend, Defense Criminal Investigative Service Capt. Charissa Sosa, tries to discourage the team against getting the plates. The mission is successful, but when the team returns to base, both the money and Morrison's vehicle are destroyed by soldier Brock Pike and his men from the private security firm Black Forest. Without Morrison (the only proof that they were authorized to act), Hannibal, Face, Murdock, and B.A. are court-martialed, sentenced to ten years in separate prisons, and dishonorably discharged. Because the plates were her responsibility, Sosa also ended up court-martialed and is demoted to lieutenant.

Six months later, Lynch visits Hannibal in prison and tells him that Pike may be trying to sell the plates with the help of an Arab backer. Hannibal, who has been tracking Pike on his own, makes a deal with Lynch: full reinstatement and clean records for his team in return for the plates. Lynch agrees and Hannibal escapes, breaking out Face, B.A., and Murdock in the process. The team hijacks a C-130, which is later destroyed by Reaper UCAVs, but not before the team parachutes away in an M8 tank stashed aboard and make it to the ground safely. The team moves to reclaim the plates and are able to kidnap Pike's backer. It is revealed that the backer is actually General Morrison in disguise, who plotted with Lynch and Pike to steal the plates but teamed up with Pike to double-cross Lynch and fake his death. Lynch orders an airstrike to kill the team and Morrison, but the team manages to escape while Morrison dies in the explosion.

Hannibal arranges to meet Sosa on board a container ship at the Port of Los Angeles, saying he will hand over "Morrison" and the plates. Face then calls Sosa on a drop phone he planted on her at a train station earlier, and conspires a different plan with her. It all unfolds according to plan until Pike, who is now working with Lynch, blows up the container ship with a rocket launcher and chases Face to near death. B.A. (having converted to Buddhism while in prison) finally gives up his pacifist ways and confronts Pike before breaking his neck, killing him and saving Face's life. Hannibal leads Lynch into a container with Murdock, who, wearing a covered bullet-proof helmet filled with ketchup, is portraying Morrison. Lynch shoots at Murdock's head, and believing that he has killed Morrison, is later tricked into admitting that he stole the plates and is subsequently caught and arrested by Sosa for his crimes.

CIA agents led by a separate "Lynch" come and claim custody of the original one. Despite their success and proving themselves innocent, the military still arrests the team for escaping from prison, also a crime; they and Sosa are angered by this, since it is only being done so Sosa's boss does not have to fill out paperwork. Sosa's boss even tries to cover their tracks because of their screw up. Sosa is reinstated to captain, but she promises to do all she can to set the team free and kisses Face as everybody is led into a prison van.

In the van, the team starts saying that the system has burned them again, but Hannibal tells them that there is always a way out of any situation, and turns towards Face, who smiles and opens his mouth, revealing a handcuff key given to him by Sosa through the kiss.

The final scene includes a narration (spoken by Corey Burton) similar to the show's opening narration revealing that the team escaped custody and now work as soldiers of fortune.

Cast

In a post-credits scene, original series actors Dirk Benedict (Face) and Dwight Schultz (Murdock) have cameos with their film equivalents Bradley Cooper and Sharlto Copley. Benedict plays Face's fellow tanning bed client, credited as "Pensacola Prisoner Milt," and Schultz plays the German neurologist who examines Murdock.

Production

Locations and filming
The entire film was shot at various locations in Canada including Kamloops, Vancouver, Cache Creek and Ashcroft, British Columbia, with much of the studio works being done at Mammoth Studios. Other footage was included as well, such as aerial shots of the Cologne train station (though erroneously referred to as Frankfurt Central Station in the movie) as well as an aerial shot of the Frankfurt skyline. Canadian Forces Base Cold Lake is also featured in the German escape scene where a number of base buildings and landmarks are clearly visible, as is the false canopy painted under the CF-18s. The Royal Canadian Air Force along with some USMC squadrons are the only Hornet users to have the false canopy painted on the bottom. American markings were digitally added later. The Hawaii Mars Martin Mars water bomber, based at Sproat Lake, British Columbia, is also used in one scene of the movie to cross the Atlantic.

Development

The film had been in development since the mid-1990s, going through a number of writers and story ideas, and being put on hold a number of times. Producer Stephen J. Cannell hoped to update the setting, perhaps using the Gulf War as part of the backstory.
John Singleton was initially assigned to direct, but in October 2008 he pulled out of the project. When Singleton was still attached to the project as director, Ice Cube was approached for the role of B.A. Baracus.

Initially greenlit on a production budget of $80 million, the final cost of the film was $110 million, which came down to around $100 million after tax credits.

Casting
In June 2009, Variety revealed that Liam Neeson was in negotiations with 20th Century Fox to star as Hannibal Smith, and Bradley Cooper announced to MTV News that he would be playing the role of Templeton Peck after he first denied the rumors saying that he was not involved and insisted that he had not seen any script.

On August 26, 2009, MMAjunkie.com reported that mixed martial arts fighter Quinton Jackson would play the role of B.A. Baracus in the upcoming film, but this was later denied by a representative for Jackson. In September 2009, The Vancouver Sun suggested that Jackson has been attached to the role and was postponing his fight at UFC 107 with Rashad Evans due to filming for The A-Team. Filming started in Vancouver in late 2009, and Jackson's involvement was then confirmed.

On September 15, 2009, Variety confirmed the casting of Neeson, Cooper and Jackson. They additionally reported that Sharlto Copley and Jessica Biel were in final negotiations to join the cast. Copley would be playing the role of H.M. Murdock and Biel would be playing the ex-lover of Face who is a disillusioned and ruthless Army officer in charge of pursuing the team. 20th Century Fox later confirmed that Copley and Biel were cast in the film.

The first official pictures of Neeson, Cooper, Copley and Jackson in character included one which features the iconic van in the background.

On October 30, 2009, Dwight Schultz confirmed that he had filmed a cameo scene for the movie. This news was followed on November 23, 2009, that Dirk Benedict would also make a cameo.
Schultz and Benedict played Howling Mad Murdock and Templeton Peck respectively in the original series. Mr. T, the original BA Baracus, did not appear in the film. In an interview with Wendy Williams, he said he did not like doing a cameo appearance in a film based on the original series he once did.

Marketing

Comics
In February 2010, it was announced a series of comics for the movie would be released beginning in March. Written by Carnahan and Chuck Dixon, the series, The A-Team: War Stories is a prelude to the film, featuring one-shots focusing each on Hannibal, Face, BA, and Murdock. A second series, The A-Team: Shotgun Wedding, is a tie-in to the film by showing an all-new adventure set after the quartet escaped. Film director Joe Carnahan and Tom Waltz collaborated to pen the series.

Jazwares released a line of action figures featuring the four main characters, plus the GMC Vandura.

Video game
An application for the iPhone was released as part of the marketing blitz for the film. The A-Team application is a side-scrolling, third person, action shooter game. Produced by RealNetworks the game includes voice-overs from B.A. Baracus.

Release
The film premiered in Los Angeles on Thursday June 3, 2010, at Grauman's Chinese Theatre on Hollywood Boulevard. Liam Neeson arrived in The A-Team custom Chevrolet G20 van; Bradley Cooper and Sharlto Copley rode in on a real U.S. Army tank. The film opened nationwide on June 11, 2010.

The film premiered in the United Kingdom on July 27, 2010, before going on general release the next day. The event was attended by the four team members along with Jessica Biel, and the A-Team van.

Home media
The film was released on December 14, 2010 on DVD and Blu-ray. It was released on DVD and Blu-ray on October 27 in Australia and on November 29, 2010 in the UK. An extended cut was also released, pushing the running time to 133 minutes. Two of the most noteworthy additions in the extended cut were the two cameo scenes of the original Face and Murdock, which were pushed back after the end credits in the original cut due to pacing.

Reception

Critical response
On Rotten Tomatoes, the film has an approval rating of 49% based on 208 reviews with an average rating of 5.40/10. The site's critical consensus reads, "The A-Team assembles a top-rate cast only to ditch the show's appealingly silly premise for explosive yet muddled blockbuster filmmaking." On Metacritic, the film has a score of 47 out of 100 based on 37 critics, indicating "mixed or average reviews". Audiences polled by CinemaScore gave the film an average grade of "B+" on an A+ to F scale.

Owen Gleiberman of Entertainment Weekly says of the film: "It's trash so compacted it glows". Richard Corliss of Time magazine calls the film "the best in a mediocre line-up of summer-action flicks". He goes on to say the film lacks "a coherent plot and complex characterization", though he does note that these qualities "are irrelevant to the genre". Peter Travers of Rolling Stone magazine calls the film, "big, loud, ludicrous and edited into visual incomprehension", but "pity the fool who lets that stand in the way of enjoying The A-Team". In contrast, Lou Lumenick of the New York Post, who titled his piece "Pity the fool who sees 'The A-Team, was among the most critical, calling the film "overlong, overblown and utterly forgettable." The Hollywood Reporter criticized the film's story, character development and logic, calling it "nearly writer-free", while the St. Petersburg Times was far more positive, calling the film "literally a blast" from start to finish, and praises it for "containing more thrills than the average shoot-em-up".

Film critic Roger Ebert of the Chicago Sun-Times said The A-Team is an incomprehensible mess, criticizing the film for being as shallow as the television series, which he describes as "punishment" when drawn out to a two-hour-long film. Stephen Whitty of The Star-Ledger complained the film makers remembered little more from the television series than a Dirty Dozen gimmick and compares the film to the "awful" Smokin' Aces by the same director.

Comments by original cast
Dirk Benedict, who played Templeton "Faceman" Peck in the TV series, spoke of regretting his cameo, stating "You'll miss me if you blink. I kind of regret doing it because it's a non-part. They wanted to be able to say, 'Oh yeah, the original cast are in it,' but we're not. It is three seconds. It's kind of insulting."

Mr. T, the original B. A. Baracus, was offered a cameo, but turned it down, feeling it would not be right for him to appear in the film if he did not play Baracus. In a 2010 interview with Script magazine, director Joe Carnahan claimed that Mr. T, after viewing scenes from the film, thought the final product was "the greatest thing in the world". After the premiere of the film Mr. T allegedly stated that he had become disillusioned and felt the story emphasized sex and violence, and that it was unfaithful to the original series. An attorney for Mr. T later stated that the actor had not yet seen the film and could not comment on it.

Dwight Schultz, who played the TV series' "Howling Mad" Murdock, issued a statement to his official fansite that the film "pays homage to the series while it eschews its essential working premise: a band of capable military brothers for hire determined to save underdog and usually poor civilians from scum. ... The team characters are sufficiently different and, with so many roles reversed from the original, one could say they are not really derivative, save for their names." He also noted that Sharlto Copley's Murdock "is faithful to the original, but at the same time is big screen twisted and right at home with the new team."

Box office
The film fell slightly short of expectations for its opening weekend, earning $26 million, as opposed to the initially predicted $30–35 million.
The film opened behind The Karate Kid, which took in $56 million. The film opened in the UK/Ireland on July 28, 2010, and came at No. 3 in at the box office with a first weekend haul of $5.6 million. , The A-Team had taken over $77.2 million at the U.S. box office, and $100 million internationally, for a worldwide total of over $177.2 million.

Accolades

Soundtrack

The soundtrack album of The A-Team was released on June 21, 2010, by Varèse Sarabande.
On December 1, 2009, it was announced that Alan Silvestri would compose the film score. Silvestri recorded his score with a 90-piece ensemble of the Hollywood Studio Symphony at the Newman Scoring Stage at 20th Century Fox.

Track listing 

Songs used in the film are:
 "House of Pain" by The Game
 "Shut Up" by Trick Daddy
 "Trio Para Enamorados (Trio for Lovers)" by Jorge Calandrelli
 "You Spin Me Round (Like a Record)" (Sung onscreen by Sharlto Copley)
 "A-Team Blastoff Suite" by Tom Morello
 "I Got Mine" by The Black Keys
 "I've Been Lonely for So Long" by Frederick Knight
 "The Washington Post" by John Philip Sousa
 "I Don't Want to Change Your Mind" by Wildlife
 "My Girl Has Rosenmand" written by Johannes Brahms and performed by Peter Schreier and Konrad Ragossnig
 "The Little Drummer Boy" written by Harry Simeone, Katherine K. Davis and Henry Onorati
 "Anarchy in the U.K." by Sex Pistols
 "I Ran 6 Miles" by Gary Sredzienski
 "Reelin' In the Years" written by Steely Dan

Cancelled sequel
Neeson, Cooper, Copley and Jackson originally expressed interest in doing a sequel. Joe Carnahan has expressed interest in directing a sequel and said it will depend on DVD and Blu-ray sales and rentals. On March 10, 2011, Cooper stated that the film had not generated enough revenue for there to be a sequel. This was confirmed by Liam Neeson in a webchat. Neeson later commented in early 2012 that he understood why the film was not successful: "I watched it about two months ago and I found it a little confusing and I was in the thing. I just couldn’t figure out who was who and what’s been done to him and why, a little bit." Later in 2013 Carnahan said on his Twitter account: "For the record guys and as much as I appreciate all the A-TEAM love. There will NOT be a sequel. It didn't make enough $$$ and that's that."

References

External links

 
 
 
 
 
 The A-Team at The Numbers

2010 films
The A-Team
2010s action adventure films
2010 action comedy films
2010s buddy comedy films
2010s chase films
2010s English-language films
20th Century Fox films
American action comedy films
American action adventure films
American buddy action films
Dune Entertainment films
Films about miscarriage of justice
Films about terrorism
Films about United States Army Rangers
Films based on television series
Films directed by Joe Carnahan
Films scored by Alan Silvestri
Films set in Colorado
Films set in Germany
Films set in Iraq
Films set in Los Angeles
Films set in Mexico
Films shot in Vancouver
Films with screenplays by Joe Carnahan
Films with screenplays by Skip Woods
Iraq War films
Scott Free Productions films
Top Cow Productions
2010s American films